The Man in Blue is a 1925 American silent drama film directed by Edward Laemmle and starring Herbert Rawlinson. The film is based upon a short story by Gerald Beaumont published in the March 1924 issue of Red Book. It was produced and distributed by Universal Pictures.

Plot
As described in a film magazine review, Police Officer Tom Conlin on his beat in New York City's Italian quarter meets and falls in love with a florist's daughter, Tita Sartori. Because he is rearing two children, Tita thinks that he is married. She is being wooed by Italian-American politician Carlo Guido, who is wealthy. The politician kidnaps Tita and keeps her at his apartment. Tom rescues her and tells her that he is single, and she admits that she loves him.

Cast

Preservation
The Man in Blue is preserved in the UCLA Film and Television Archive.

References

External links

Lobby poster; daybill

1925 films
American silent feature films
Universal Pictures films
Films based on short fiction
1925 drama films
Films directed by Edward Laemmle
American black-and-white films
Silent American drama films
1920s American films
Films with screenplays by Richard Schayer
1920s police films
Films set in New York City
Films about Italian-American culture
1920s English-language films
English-language drama films